Per Skjerwen Olsen (born 26 September 1939) is a Norwegian ice hockey player. He played for the Norwegian national ice hockey team, and  participated at the Winter Olympics in 1964 and 1968. He was Norwegian champion with Vålerenga in 1965, 1966, 1967, 1968 and 1969. He was awarded Gullpucken as best Norwegian ice hockey player in 1966.

References

1939 births
Living people
Ice hockey people from Oslo
Norwegian ice hockey players
Norwegian footballers
Olympic ice hockey players of Norway
Ice hockey players at the 1964 Winter Olympics
Ice hockey players at the 1968 Winter Olympics
Vålerenga Ishockey players

Association footballers not categorized by position